Millers Lake is a census-designated place (CDP) in the northwest part of Deerfield Township, Lapeer County, Michigan, United States, surrounding a lake of the same name. It is bordered to the east by the CDP of Barnes Lake. M-24 forms the border between the two CDPs; the state highway leads north  to Mayville and south  to Lapeer.

Millers Lake was first listed as a CDP prior to the 2020 census. Previously, the community was part of the Barnes Lake-Millers Lake CDP.

Demographics

References 

Census-designated places in Lapeer County, Michigan
Census-designated places in Michigan
Unincorporated communities in Michigan
Unincorporated communities in Lapeer County, Michigan